The 2005 Patriot League men's basketball tournament was played at Sojka Pavilion in Lewisburg, Pennsylvania and Hart Center in Worcester, Massachusetts after the conclusion of the 2004–05 regular season. Number two seed Bucknell defeated top seed , 61–57 in the championship game, to win its first Patriot League Tournament title. The Bison earned an automatic bid to the 2005 NCAA tournament as #14 seed in the Syracuse region. In the round of 64, Bucknell upset #3 seed Kansas 64–63. It was the first win for a Patriot League team in the NCAA Tournament, and the first time Kansas lost an opening-round game since 1978.

Format
All eight league members participated in the tournament, with teams seeded according to regular season conference record.

Bracket

* denotes overtime period

References

Tournament
Patriot League men's basketball tournament
Patriot League men's basketball tournament
Patriot League men's basketball tournament
Patriot League men's basketball tournament